Senator Gallagher may refer to:

Frank Gallagher (Brooklyn) (1870–1932), New York State Senate
John P. Gallagher (1932–2011), New Jersey State Senate
Owen A. Gallagher (1902–1977), Massachusetts State Senate
Raymond F. Gallagher (born 1939), New York State Senate